The Singerman list is a numeric cataloging system for antisemitica items, as defined by the 1982 bibliographic listing, Antisemitic Propaganda: an annotated bibliography and research guide by Robert Singerman. The list consists of a chronological listing, by year at least, of books, pamphlets, and other sorts of texts, with full bibliographic information. In addition each item is assigned a unique 4-digit number with a short, paragraph-length, annotation. For example, "Singerman 0121" identifies uniquely a particular imprint of The Jewish Bolshevism.

Most imprints of the Protocols of the Elders of Zion, not just first editions, that were published in Europe or the United States are listed and uniquely identified, as are many other noteworthy antisemitic publications.

The book's foreword is by Colin Holmes. As of 2007, the work is out of print.

The book is used extensively by rare book dealers and antiquarians specializing in antisemitica in precisely identifying first editions and rare books or imprints sought after by book collectors.

The Singerman list

1918 
Singerman 0089
Spencer, Harold Sherwood
Democracy or Shylocracy —
A Brief for Men and Women Who Labour and Who Sacrifice to Make the World Safe for Democracy,
Only to Find Themselves Enslaved by Capitalism and Their Earnings Controlled by Monopolists
(London: C. F. Roworth, 1918)
 63 pp.

1920

1921 
0120 The Grave Diggers of Russia (1921)
0121 The Jewish Bolshevism (1921)
0123
Victor E. Marsden
Jews in Russia (1921)
With Half-Jews and "Damped Jews
With a List of the Names of the 447 Jews in the Soviet Government in Russia
(London: Judaic Publishing Co., 1921)
22 pp.
Singerman annotation: "Concludes that the so-called "Russian Revolution of 1917
was in fact a Jewish revolution. To support this claim, Marsden lists 447 Jewish commissars
who dominate the Soviet bureaucracy. [etc. - to be continued]
See: The Jewish Bolshevism

1923 
0147
Victor E. Marsden
"Protocols of the Wise Men of Zion"
Protocols of the Meetings of the Learned Elders of Zion
Translated from the Russian Text by Victor E. Marsden
(London: The Britons, 1923)
The Marsden translation has become the standard English Text.

References
Library of Congress:
LC Control No.: 	 81043363
Type of Material: 	Book (Print, Microform, Electronic, etc.)
Personal Name: 	Singerman, Robert.
Main Title: 	Antisemitic propaganda : an annotated bibliography and research guide / Robert Singerman ; foreword by Colin :Holmes.
Published/Created: 	New York : Garland, 1982.
Description: 	xxxvii, 448 p. ; 23 cm.

Notes: 	Includes bibliographical references and index.
Subjects: 	Antisemitism--United States--Bibliography.
	Antisemitism--Great Britain--Bibliography.
Series: 	Garland reference library of social science ; v. 112
LC Classification: 	Z6374.A56 S56 1982 DS141
Dewey Class No.: 	016.3058/924 19

Antisemitic publications
Religious bibliographies
Book collecting
Library cataloging and classification
Published bibliographies
1982 non-fiction books